Hankey Bannister is a blended scotch whisky produced by Inver House Distillers, a subsidiary of the Thailand based company ThaiBev. It is named after its founders Beaumont Hankey and Hugh Bannister. Hankey Bannister is blended from Lowland grains and Highland and Speyside malt whiskies.

History
Founded in 1757, the wines & spirits company first established premises at Johns Street in London's West End. In 1785 the cellars moved to Adelphi Arches under Adelphi Terrace, London's first neo-classical building designed by the Adams brothers.   The cellars remained there until 1936, when the Arches were demolished.

Hankey Bannister & Co moved thousands of bottles to new storage across the river to Southwark, near the site of Shakespeare's Globe Theatre where, even so, the incendiary bombs found them during World War II in 1940.  After moving to 22 St. James Street, Hankey Bannister began absorbing a number of other West End firms, acting as an umbrella for various small wine merchants, supplying the Royal Household and many exclusive clubs.

In 1915 Hankey Bannister & Co moved to 32, Sackville Street where it remained until Saccone & Speed purchased the business in 1932 after the death of Douglas Hankey.  Hankey Bannister was a favorite of Prince Regent William IV and the Dukes of Norfolk and Queensberry and received a Royal Warrant under George V.

Hankey Bannister was a favorite with war-time Prime Minister Sir Winston Churchill and British writer Evelyn Waugh.  During the Top Gear Burma Special Richard Hammond referenced the drink, with Jeremy Clarkson declaring it to be the "third best whisky in Northern Burma".

The Distilleries
Hankey Bannister Original contains single malts from all five of the Inver House Distilleries:
Pulteney Distillery
Balblair Distillery
Knockdhu Distillery, home of anCnoc
Speyburn Distillery
Balmenach Distillery

Current range
Hankey Bannister Original Blend
Hankey Bannister Heritage Blend
Hankey Bannister The 12 Year Old Regency
Hankey Bannister The 21 Year Old Partners' Reserve
Hankey Bannister Aged  25 Years
Hankey Bannister Aged 40 Years

References

External links
Official Site
http://www.interbevgroup.com
http://www.whiskyintelligence.com/2013/07/a-rare-expression-from-the-1920s-inspires-hankey-bannister-heritage-blend-scotch-whisky-news/
Blended Scotch whisky
Alcoholic drink brands